Justin Marion Stein (August 9, 1911 – May 1, 1992), nicknamed "Ott", was an infielder in Major League Baseball. He played for the Philadelphia Phillies and Cincinnati Reds.

References

External links

1911 births
1992 deaths
Major League Baseball infielders
Philadelphia Phillies players
Cincinnati Reds players
Baseball players from St. Louis